The Little Seboeis River is a short stream in Maine Township 4, Range 7, WELS, Penobscot County, Maine.

See also
List of rivers of Maine

References

Maine Streamflow Data from the USGS
Maine Watershed Data From Environmental Protection Agency

Rivers of Maine
Tributaries of the Penobscot River
Rivers of Penobscot County, Maine